Greenwood, also known as Beverly Hall, is a historic mansion in Memphis, Tennessee, USA.

History
The two-story mansion was built from 1904 to 1906 for C. Hunter Raine. It was designed in the Colonial Revival architectural style. When it was purchased by Austin Boyd and his wife in 1914, they renamed it Beverly Hall.

It has been listed on the National Register of Historic Places since July 9, 1979.

References

Houses on the National Register of Historic Places in Tennessee
Colonial Revival architecture in Tennessee
Houses completed in 1906
Houses in Memphis, Tennessee
National Register of Historic Places in Memphis, Tennessee
1906 establishments in Tennessee